Ecuador competed at the 2013 World Games held in Cali, Colombia.

Medalists

Karate 

Jacqueline Factos won the silver medal in the women's kumite 61 kg event.

Powerlifting 

José Castillo won the bronze medal in the men's middleweight event.

References 

Nations at the 2013 World Games
2013 in Ecuadorian sport
2013